The men's 50m breaststroke events at the 2022 World Para Swimming Championships were held at the Penteada Olympic Swimming Complex in Madeira between 12 and 18 June.

Medalists

Results

SB2
Heats
13 swimmers from ten nations took part. The swimmers with the top eight times, regardless of heat, advanced to the final.

Final
The final was held on 12 June 2022.

SB3

References

2022 World Para Swimming Championships